The Pursuit of Pamela is a 1920 British silent comedy drama film directed by Harold M. Shaw, starring Edna Flugrath, Templar Powell and Douglas Munro, and based on a play by C. B. Fernald.

Premise
Following her wedding a bride runs away from her much older husband and goes after a younger man who gone to the far east.

Cast
 Edna Flugrath - Pamela Dodder 
 Templar Powell - Allan Graeme 
 Douglas Munro - John Dodder 
 Ada Palmer - Miss Astby 
 Hubert Willis - Peter Dodder 
 Wyndham Guise - Scot McVelie 
 Ma Fue - Fah Nin

References

External links

1920 films
1920 comedy-drama films
Films directed by Harold M. Shaw
British comedy-drama films
British black-and-white films
British silent feature films
1920s English-language films
1920s British films
Silent comedy-drama films